The Rio Grande de Buba, also called the Rio Buba, Rio Grande, and Grande River, is an estuary of West Africa that is entirely contained within Guinea-Bissau, where it empties into the Atlantic Ocean.

The Grande was commercially important in the late 16th century, but this soon changed: "Biafada and Mandinka traders along the Geba River and the Papel of Bissau greatly benefited from the precipitous decline of Grande River trade as Bijago raiders increasingly disrupted Biafada and lançado commerce and terrorized Biafada communities along the river."

References

Rivers of Guinea-Bissau